Mark Loria Gallery is one of the leading indigenous art galleries in the world specializing in contemporary art from the Northwest Coast of Canada. Based in downtown Victoria, BC - and grateful to be on the traditional Coast Salish territories of the Lekwungen-speaking peoples - Mark Loria gallery has been proud to represent the leading indigenous artists from Vancouver Island, BC and Canada for over 40 years (previously known as Alcheringa Gallery), and has placed art in private and public collections all over the world. Leading gallery artists include Susan Point (Coast Salish), Robert Davidson (Haida), Rande Cook (Kwakwaka'wakw), Maynard Johnny Jr (Coast Salish), Dylan Thomas (Coast Salish), and KC Hall (Heiltsuk).

The gallery produces four to six exhibitions every year, supplemented by ongoing new works by over 40 gallery artists. Mark Loria Gallery has one of the largest indigenous fine art print collections to be found anywhere, and also represents paintings, carvings/sculptures, wearable art, ceramics, and textiles. The gallery has had a decade's long commitment to supporting and promoting artists by donating back to their communities in ongoing efforts to preserve and protect indigenous culture.

The original name of Mark Loria Gallery - Alcheringa - is an Aboriginal Australian word for the Dreamtime, the mythical time of creation, when the world and all living creatures were sung into existence. Similarly as it is in the Northwest Coast, it is believed that singing and dancing maintain the state of the spirit world and the physical landscape, and that these invisible song-lines hold Mother Earth together.

Mark Loria Gallery carries on this tradition and philosophy with artworks that represent the sacred, supernatural, and mysteries in indigenous art that goes beyond what is shared and visible.

It was one of the first galleries to make use of the internet in 1996.

Mark Loria Gallery is a member of the Art Dealers Association of Canada.The gallery sells indigenous art to private collectors, governments, museums, architects, designers, and corporate clients, as well as offering other art-related services such as appraisals and consignment.

See also
Northwest Coast art
Contemporary art
Canadian art
Coast Salish art

References

External links
Mark Loria Gallery
Art Dealers Association of Canada

Northwest Coast art
Papua New Guinean culture
Australian Aboriginal art
Art museums and galleries in British Columbia
Museums in Victoria, British Columbia